Angela Slatter is a writer based in Brisbane, Australia. Primarily working in the field of speculative fiction, she has focused on short stories since deciding to pursue writing in 2005, when she undertook a Graduate Diploma in Creative Writing. Since then she has written a number of short stories, many of which were included in her two compilations, Sourdough and Other Stories (2010) and The Girl With No Hands and other tales (2010).

Education
Slatter is a graduate of Clarion South 2009 and the Tin House Summer Writers Workshop 2006. She has an MA and a PhD in Creative Writing. In 2013 she was awarded one of the inaugural Queensland Writers Fellowships.

Slatter occasionally teaches creative writing at the Queensland University of Technology.

Writing

Angela Slatter's short stories have appeared in anthologies and journals in Australia and internationally. Her work has been listed for Honourable Mention by Ellen Datlow, Gavin Grant and Kelly Link; and she has been nominated three times for the Aurealis Award for best fantasy short story. Along with the Aurealis Awards, Slatter has been nominated for the Ditmar Award on two occasions: as Best New Talent in 2008, and for Best Short Story in 2010.

In 2010, Slatter published two short story collections: Sourdough & Other Stories with Tartarus Press (UK) which received a Starred Review at Publishers Weekly, and The Girl with No Hands & Other Tales (Ticonderoga Publications). She is currently working on a "duopoly" consisting of the novels Well of Souls and Gate of the Dead.

In 2016, her first solo full-length novel Vigil was released. She is currently working on the final book in the "Verity Fassbinder" trilogy.

Reception

Slatter's works have been well received. She has received praise from Publishers Weekly for her "evocative and poetic prose" in Sourdough & Other Stories, and her writing garnered similar comments from Jeff Vandermeer, who described it as "brilliant, muscular, and original". In particular, Slatter has received critical acclaim for her style of retelling or "reloading" fairytales.

Individual short stories have, at times, been highlighted by reviewers: in particular, her story "The Jacaranda Wife" was perceived as one of the best stories in Jack Dann's Dreaming Again anthology by The Australian, as well as being praised by The Cairns Post and The Sydney Morning Herald, who wrote: "The collection's trump card is the quality of its new writers, many of whom produce stronger stories than some of the veterans ... Particular standouts are ... Angela Slatter's haunting The Jacaranda Wife, set in colonial Australia, seems to build towards a climax truly sinister, yet instead leaves you with beautiful imagery that is as otherworldly as it is strangely touching." Similarly, Scoop Magazine described her collaborative story, "The February Dragon" (with Lisa L Hannett) as being a "highlight" of Scary Kisses.

Kim Wilkins has cited Slatter as a SF author of note in a forthcoming chapter in the Cambridge Companion to Creative Writing.

Slatter was the subject of an extensive feature in Issue 21 of Black Static Magazine, which had her photograph on the cover. Its review of Sourdough and Other Stories states, "The effect is almost as if Quentin Tarantino had decided to write fairy stories instead of scripting Pulp Fiction." (page 44)

Her collection, The Girl With No Hands and other tales was a finalist for the 2010 Australian Shadows Award for Long Fiction, and her story "Brisneyland by Night" is a finalist for Short Fiction.

In May 2011, Slatter was the winner of 2010 Aurealis Award for Best Collection with The Girl With No Hands and other tales and Best Fantasy Short Story for The February Dragon, co-written with L.L. Hannett. This award was jointly awarded to Thoraiya Dyer for Yowie.

Her collection, Sourdough and other stories was a finalist for the World Fantasy Award.

Slatter was awarded the British Fantasy Award in 2012 for her short story "The Coffin-Maker's Daughter".

The collection, The Bitterwood Bible and Other Recountings was co-winner of the World Fantasy Award, Best Collection, 2015.

Bibliography

Verity Fassbinder
 Vigil, Jo Fletcher Books, 2016 
 Corpselight, Jo Fletcher Books, 2017 
 Restoration (2018)

Other Novels
 All the Murmuring Bones (2021) (as A.G. Slatter)
 The Path of Thorns (forthcoming, 2022) (as A.G. Slatter)

Collections
 Sourdough and Other Stories, Tartarus Press, 2010 
 The Girl With No Hands and other tales, Ticonderoga Publications, 2010 
 Midnight and Moonshine, with Lisa L. Hannett, Ticonderoga Publications, 2012
 The Bitterwood Bible and Other Recountings, Tartarus Press, 2014
 Black-Winged Angels, Ticonderoga Publications, 2014
 The Female Factory, with Lisa L. Hannett, Twelfth Planet Press, 2014
 The Heart is a Mirror for Sinners and Other Stories, 2020 – winner, 2020 Aurealis Award for best collection
 The Tallow-Wife and Other Tales (2021)

Short stories

Anthologies
 "The Curious Case of Physically-Manifested Bedsheet Mania & Other Tales", co-authored with Lisa Hannett, in Jeff Vandermeer's and Ann VanderMeer's Steampunk II: Steampunk Reloaded, Tachyon Publications, 2010.
 "Genevieve and the Dragon", Worlds Next Door, 2010.
 "The February Dragon", co-authored with Lisa L. Hannett, Scary Kisses, 2010.
 "Brisneyland by Night", Sprawl, 2010.
 "Sister, Sister", Strange Tales III, 2009.
 "Light as Mist, Heavy as Hope", Needles & Bones, 2009.
 "The Piece of Ice in Miss Windermere's Heart", New Ceres Nights, 2009.
 "The Jacaranda Wife", Dreaming Again edited by Jack Dann (HarperCollins), 2008. Honourable Mention, 2008 Year's Best Horror (ed. Ellen Datlow).
 "I Love You Like Water", 2012.
 "The Nun's Tale", Canterbury 2100, 2008.
 "Sourdough", Strange Tales II, 2007. Honourable Mention, 2008 Year's Best Fantasy and Horror (ed. Ellen Datlow, Kelly Link, and Gavin Grant).
 "Lavinia's Wood", She Walks In Shadows, 2015 (ed. Silvia Moreno-Garcia)

Magazines and journals
Of Sorrow and Such, A Tor.Com Novella, 2015
 "The Chrysanthemum Bride", Fantasy Magazine, December 2009
 "Words", The Lifted Brow # 5, June 2009 issue, shortlisted for Aurealis Award for Best Fantasy Short Story 2009
 "Frozen", Mort Castle's Doorways Magazine, Issue 8, April 2009
  "The Girl with No Hands", Lady Churchill's Rosebud Wristlet No. 23, 2008
 "Dresses, three", Shimmer 2008. Short-listed for Best Fantasy Short Story Aurealis Award 2008. Honourable Mention, 2008 Year's Best Horror (ed. Ellen Datlow, 2009)
 "The Hummingbird Heart", Shimmer 2008. Honourable Mention, 2008 Year's Best Horror (ed. Ellen Datlow, 2009)
 "Skin", The Lifted Brow #3
 "Little Radish", Crimson Highway, 2008 Honourable Mention, 2008 Year's Best Horror (ed. Ellen Datlow, 2009)
 "Pressina's Daughters", Winter 2007/2008, issue No. 71 of ONSPEC: The Canadian Magazine of the Fantastic.
 "The Danger of Warmth", Crimson Highway 2007.
  "Cedar Splinters", Artworker Magazine, October 2007.
 "The Little Match Girl", Shimmer #3, 2006. Honourable Mention, 2007 Year's Best Fantasy and Horror (ed. Ellen Datlow, Kelly Link, and Gavin Grant).
 "Bluebeard", Shimmer #4, 2006. Honourable Mention, 2007 Year's Best Fantasy and Horror (ed. Ellen Datlow, Kelly Link, and Gavin Grant).
 "The Angel Wood", Shimmer #5, 2006. Short-listed for Best Fantasy Short Story Aurealis Award 2007. Honourable Mention, 2007 Year's Best Fantasy and Horror (ed. Ellen Datlow, Kelly Link, and Gavin Grant).
 "The Juniper Tree", Lady Churchill's Rosebud Wristlet #18, 2006.
 "Red Skein", Walking Bones Magazine, 2006.

Flash fiction
 "Inheritance", The Daily Cabal, June 2009.
 "Brisneyland by Night – Part Four", The Daily Cabal, June 2009.
 "Aeaea Street", The Daily Cabal, May 2009.
 "Lantern", The Daily Cabal, May 2009.
  "Brisneyland by Night – Part Three", The Daily Cabal, May 2009.
 "Brisneyland by Night – Part Two", The Daily Cabal, April 2009.
 "The Impatient Dead", The Daily Cabal, April 2009.
 "Hermione's Farewell", The Daily Cabal, April 2009.
 "Red New Day", The Daily Cabal, March 2009.
 "Foundation", The Daily Cabal, February 2009.
 "Beggar-maid", The Daily Cabal, January 2009.
 "Sunday Drivers", The Daily Cabal, October 2008.
 "Things Best Left Alone", The Daily Cabal, October 2008.
 "Seek", The Daily Cabal, November 2008.
 "Brisneyland by Night", The Daily Cabal, December 2008.
 "The Problem of Thorns", The Daily Cabal, December 2008.
 "Binoorie", The Daily Cabal, December 2008.
 "Little Green Apples", Microfiction Antipodean SF, issue 110
 "Crush", Microfiction in Antipodean SF, issue 103
 "Swept Off Her Feet", Microfiction in Antipodean SF, issue 74
 "Mating Season", Microfiction in Antipodean SF, issue 72
 "Shades and Shadows", Microfiction in Antipodean SF, issue 71
 "The Halite Chronicles", Microfiction in Antipodean SF, issue 70
 "Midnight Swim", Microfiction in Antipodean SF, issue 69
 "Icon of the Underworld", Microfiction in Antipodean SF, issue 67

Articles

 "Finding a Literary Agent: The Ugly Truth", in The Australian Writer's Marketplace, 11th edition, 2011/12, August 2010.
 "Getting Published: The Good, the Bad and the Ugly", feature article with Katherine Lyall-Watson, November 2008 issue of Writing Queensland.
 "To Review or Not to Review", feature article, October 2007 issue of Writing Queensland.
 "Zen and the Art of PhD Maintenance", Issue 4 of The Definite Article, October 2007.
 "Little Red Riding Hood: Life off the Path", Apex Science Fiction and Horror Digest, Volume 1, Issue 12, 2008.
 "Tin House: What I Did On My Summer Vacation", feature article, October 2006 issue of Writing Queensland.
 "Postcard from Tin House", June 2006 issue of Writing Queensland.
 "Kim Wilkins: Brisbane Gothic", Feature Article in Antipodean SF, issue 75

References

External links
 Angela Slatter interviewed by Charles Tan

Living people
Australian fantasy writers
Australian science fiction writers
Australian women short story writers
Australian horror writers
1967 births
Women science fiction and fantasy writers
Women horror writers
World Fantasy Award-winning writers